This is a list of solo piano pieces by Wolfgang Amadeus Mozart.

Pieces

Sonatas 
 Piano Sonata No. 1 in C major, K. 279/189d (Munich, Autumn 1774)
 Piano Sonata No. 2 in F major, K. 280/189e (Munich, Autumn 1774)
 Piano Sonata No. 3 in B major, K. 281/189f (Munich, Autumn 1774)
 Piano Sonata No. 4 in E major, K. 282/189g (Munich, Autumn 1774)
 Piano Sonata No. 5 in G major, K. 283/189h (Munich, Autumn 1774)
 Piano Sonata No. 6 in D major, K. 284/205b (Munich, February–March 1775)
 Piano Sonata No. 7 in C major, K. 309/284b (Mannheim, November 8, 1777)
 Piano Sonata No. 8 in A minor, K. 310/300d (Paris, Summer 1778)
 Piano Sonata No. 9 in D major, K. 311/284c (Mannheim, November 1777)
 Piano Sonata No. 10 in C major, K. 330/300h (Vienna or Salzburg, 1783)
 Piano Sonata No. 11 in A major, K. 331/300i ("Turkish Rondo") (Vienna or Salzburg, 1783)
 Piano Sonata No. 12 in F major, K. 332/300k (Vienna or Salzburg, 1783)
 Piano Sonata No. 13 in B major, K. 333/315c (Linz, 1783)
 Piano Sonata No. 14 in C minor, K. 457 (Vienna, October 14, 1784)
 Piano Sonata No. 15 in F major, K. 533/494 (Vienna, January 3, 1788)
 Piano Sonata No. 16 in C major, K. 545 (so-called facile or semplice sonata; Vienna, June 26, 1788)
 Piano Sonata No. 17 in B major, K. 570 (Vienna, February, 1789)
 Piano Sonata No. 18 in D major, K. 576 (Vienna, July 1789)

Miscellaneous pieces
 Nannerl Notenbuch
 Andante in C, K. 1a
 Allegro in C, K. 1b
 Allegro in F, K. 1c
 Minuet in F, K. 1d
 Minuet in G, K. 1e
 Minuet in C, K. 1f
 Minuet in F, K. 2
 Allegro in B-flat, K. 3
 Minuet in F, K. 4
 Minuet in F "Triolen-Menuett", K. 5
 Klavierstück in C, K. 5a
 Andante in B-flat, K. 5b
 Allegro in C major, K. 9a/5a
 Klavierstück in F, K. 33B (Zurich, 30 September 1766)
 Allegro in G major, K. 72a (doubtful)
 Allegro in D major, K. 626b/16 (1773)
Country Dances for Johann Rudolf Graf Czernin in G major, K. deest (1777)
 Andantino in E-flat major, K. 236/588b (1783; Based on the aria "Non vi turbate, no" from Act II of Alceste, Wq.44, by Gluck)
 Fantasy No. 1 with Fugue in C major, K. 394 (Vienna, 1782)
 Fantasy No. 2 in C minor, K. 396 (Vienna, 1782)
 Fantasy No. 3 in D minor, K. 397 (Vienna, 1782)
 Fantasy No. 4 in C minor, K. 475 (Vienna, May 20, 1785)
 Rondo No. 1 in D major, K. 485
 Rondo No. 2 in F major, K. 494 (finale to K. 533 above initially published alone)
 Rondo No. 3 in A minor, K. 511
 Adagio in B minor, K. 540 (Vienna, 1788)
 Piano Sonata in F major, K. 547a (Anh. 135) (spurious) (Vienna, Summer 1788) (adapted from K. 547 and K. 545)
 Adagio in B minor, K. deest (1788)
 Adagio and Menuett in D, K.Anh. 34
 Andante in F major, K.Anh. 138 (1805-06; This work is a transcription of the 2nd movement of String quartet no. 15 in D minor, K. 421/417b)

Variations
 8 Variations in G major on the Dutch song "Laat ons Juichen, Batavieren!" by Christian Ernst Graaf, K. 24
 7 Variations in D major on the Dutch song "Willem van Nassau", K. 25
 6 Variations in F major, K. 54/547b (Anh. 138a)
 12 Variations in C major on a Menuet by Johann Christian Fischer, K. 179
 6 Variations in G major on "Mio car Adone" from the opera "La fiera di Venezia" by Antonio Salieri, K. 180
 9 Variations in C major on the arietta "Lison dormait" from the opera "Julie" by Nicolas Dezède, K. 264
 12 Variations in C major on the French song "Ah, vous dirai-je, Maman", K. 265
 8 Variations in F major on the choir "Dieu d'amour" from the opera "Les mariages samnites" by André Grétry, K. 352
 12 Variations in E major on the French song "La belle Françoise", K. 353
 12 Variations in E major on the Romance "Je suis Lindor" from "Le Barbier de Seville" by Pierre Beaumarchais, music by Antoine-Laurent Baudron, K. 354
 6 Variations in F major on the aria "Salve tu, Domine" from the opera "I filosofi immaginarii" by Giovanni Paisiello, K. 398
 10 Variations in G major on the aria "Unser dummer Pöbel meint" from "La rencontre imprévue" by Christoph Willibald Gluck, K. 455
 8 Variations in A major on "Come un agnello" from "Fra i due litiganti il terzo gode" by Giuseppe Sarti, K. 460
 12 Variations on an Allegretto in B major, K. 500
 9 Variations in D major on a Menuet by Jean-Pierre Duport, K. 573
 8 Variations in F major on the song "Ein Weib ist das herrlichste Ding" from the Singspiel "Der dumme Gartner" by Benedikt Schack, K. 613
 10 Variations in A major on the French song "Malbrough s'en va-t-en guerre", K.Anh.C 26.09

Other piano pieces 
 The London Sketchbook, K. 15a–ss
 Allegro of a Sonata in G minor, K. 312/189i/590d (incomplete, completed by an unknown hand)
 Minuet in D, K. 355/576b
 Capriccio in C, K. 395
 Suite in C (Overture, Allemande, Courante and incomplete Sarabande), K. 399
 Allegro in B (incomplete; completed by M. Stadler), K. 400
 Fugue in G minor (incomplete), K. 401
 Funeral March in C minor, K. 453a
 Piano Sonata in B major, K. 498a (unverified)
 Kleine Gigue in G, K. 574
 Andante in F for a Small Mechanical Organ, K. 616 (1791)

See also 
 List of compositions by Wolfgang Amadeus Mozart
 The Complete Mozart Edition

References 

Piano solos
Lists of piano compositions by composer
Compositions for solo piano